Leimert Park station is an underground light rail station on the K Line of the Los Angeles Metro Rail system. It is located underneath Crenshaw Boulevard at its intersection with Vernon Avenue in the Leimert Park neighborhood of Los Angeles.

The Leimert Park station was funded and fully incorporated into the project in May 2013 after massive community support for a tunnel under Park Mesa Heights.

The station opened on October 7, 2022. Metro held a ceremonial ribbon cutting ceremony for the station on June 25, 2022.

The station incorporates artwork by three artists: Ingrid Calame, Mickalene Thomas, and Deanna Erdmann.

Service

Station layout

Hours and frequency

Connections 
, the following connections are available:
LADOT DASH: Leimert/Slauson

Notable places nearby 
The station is within walking distance of the following notable places:
 Leimert Plaza Park
 Vision Theatre

References

External links

K Line (Los Angeles Metro) stations
Crenshaw, Los Angeles
Railway stations in the United States opened in 2022